Richard Lee Stansbury (born December 23, 1959), is an American college basketball who most recently was the coach for   the Western Kentucky Hilltoppers basketball team from 2016-2023 He was hired as the WKU head coach on March 28, 2016. He is a member of the Campbellsville University Athletics Hall of Fame.

Early life
Born in Battletown, Kentucky, Stansbury played high school basketball for Meade County High School in Brandenburg, Kentucky from which he graduated in 1977. From 1977 to 1981, he played college basketball at Campbellsville College (now Campbellsville University) in Campbellsville, Kentucky. He led the team to the NAIA Tournament in his senior season.

Coaching career

Early coaching career
Stansbury began his coaching career at his alma mater as a student assistant (1982–83). Following his stint at Campbellsville, he served as a graduate assistant at Cumberland College (now University of the Cumberlands) in Williamsburg, Kentucky (1983–84). There, he helped to lead the team to a 31–5 mark and a second round appearance in the NAIA Tournament.

In 1984, Stansbury moved to Austin Peay State University in Clarksville, Tennessee, where he served a six-year term as an assistant, helping guide that team to three consecutive winning seasons, beginning with a conference tournament championship and a subsequent NCAA tournament second round berth during the 1986–87 season, while the Governors posted a mark of 20–12.

Mississippi State
After leaving Austin Peay, Stansbury served as an assistant coach at Mississippi State under Richard Williams from 1990 to 1994. He became Williams' associate head coach and top recruiter in 1994 and remained in that position until 1998. During those eight seasons, the Bulldogs won the Southeastern Conference (SEC) regular season championship (1991), twice won the SEC West crown (1995 and 1996), won the SEC tournament championship (1996); advanced to the Sweet 16  in back to back years (1995 and 1996) and reached the Final Four in 1996.

Taking over the helm as the Bulldogs head coach in 1998, Stansbury led his team to postseason tournament play 11 times in 14 seasons (six NCAA and five NIT tournaments), with five consecutive post-season tournament appearances, the first MSU basketball coach in history to accomplish this feat. His 2001–02 MSU team compiled the most wins in a single season in school history (27). Also achieved the highest national ranking in school history in 2003–04, No. 2 in the country (finished 26–4). Stansbury also owns MSU's record for consecutive 20-win seasons with four from 2001 to 2005 and again from 2006 to 2010.

From his days as an MSU assistant until 2012, Stansbury was part of over 15 postseason tournament appearances. Prior to his arrival at Mississippi State, MSU had two post-seasons in 27 years (both NIT). He was also 21–8 vs conference in-state rival, the Ole Miss Rebels.

During the 2007–08 season, Stansbury passed Williams as the all-time most successful basketball coach at Mississippi State, with 192 wins, but was never able to match Williams's run in the NCAA tourney as he failed to get past the 2nd Round.  Stansbury retired with 293 wins, ranking 9th in the history of the SEC. Stansbury announced his retirement on March 15, 2012; he cited a desire to spend more time with his family.

Texas A&M
In May 2014, he was back into coaching as an assistant at Texas A&M under Billy Kennedy. Stansbury helped the Aggie coaching staff sign a consensus top-10 recruiting class which was regarded as one of the most heralded groups in school history. On April 10, 2015 Stansbury was promoted to Associate Head Coach.

Western Kentucky
On March 28, 2016, Stansbury was hired as head coach at Western Kentucky University, replacing Ray Harper who resigned March 17, 2016. Stansbury resigned on March 11, 2023 citing needing to focus on his health and family. During Stansbury’s time on the Hill, he led the Hilltoppers to four 20-win seasons and three Conference USA Tournament title game appearances during his tenure, but failed to make the NCAA Tournament.

Head coaching record

References

1959 births
Living people
American men's basketball players
Austin Peay Governors men's basketball coaches
Basketball coaches from Kentucky
Basketball players from Kentucky
Campbellsville Tigers men's basketball coaches
Campbellsville Tigers men's basketball players
Cumberlands Patriots men's basketball coaches
Mississippi State Bulldogs men's basketball coaches
People from Clarksville, Tennessee
People from Meade County, Kentucky
Texas A&M Aggies men's basketball coaches
Western Kentucky Hilltoppers basketball coaches